Celaenorrhinus sumitra is a species of butterfly in the family Hesperiidae. It is found in India.

References

Butterflies described in 1866
sumitra
Butterflies of Asia
Taxa named by Frederic Moore